"Hooray for Hazel" is a song written and performed by Tommy Roe with backing vocals by Lee Mallory.  It reached number 1 in New Zealand, number 2 in Canada, number 6 on the Billboard Hot 100, and number 28 in Australia, in 1966.  It was featured on his 1966 album Sweet Pea.

The song was ranked number 43 on Billboard magazine's Top Hot 100 songs of 1966.

Other versions
Teddy Robin and the Playboys released a version in 1967.

References

1966 songs
1966 singles
Songs written by Tommy Roe
Tommy Roe songs
Number-one singles in New Zealand
ABC Records singles